The Last Valley is a 1971 film directed by James Clavell, a historical drama set during the Thirty Years' War (1618–1648). While war ravages southern Germany, a mercenary leader (Michael Caine) and a teacher (Omar Sharif) stumble upon a valley untouched by the war. Based upon the novel The Last Valley (1959), by J. B. Pick, the cinematic version of The Last Valley, directed by James Clavell, was the final feature film photographed with the Todd-AO 70 mm widescreen process until it was revived to make the film Baraka in 1991.

Plot
"The Captain" leads a band of mercenaries who fight for whoever will pay them, regardless of religion. His soldiers pillage the countryside, raping and looting when not fighting. Vogel is a former teacher trying to survive the fighting and resulting chaos in south-central Germany. Vogel runs from the Captain's force, and eventually stumbles upon an idyllic mountain valley, untouched by war.

The Captain and his small band are not far behind. Caught, Vogel convinces the Captain to preserve the village so it can shelter the band through the coming winter, as the outside world faces famine, plague and the devastation of war. "Live," Vogel tells the Captain, "while the army dies." The Captain thinks the idea is good. He kills Korski, one of his own men, without warning when Korski objects to the idea of desertion. The local headman, Gruber, submits, after obtaining the best terms he can. The local Catholic priest is livid that the mercenaries include a number of Protestants (and nihilistic atheists for that matter), but there is nothing he can do to sway the Captain. The Captain kills several dissenting members of his band to uphold their pledge to set aside religious divisions.

The locals accept their fate. Vogel is appointed judge by the Captain to settle disputes between villagers and soldiers. As long as food, shelter, and a small number of women are provided, the mercenaries leave the locals alone. The Captain takes Gruber's wife, Erica, for himself. Hansen attempts to rape a girl. When Vogel stops him, he and two others try but fail to kill the Captain. They flee, but return with a larger mercenary band before the winter closes the valley to outsiders. However, the Captain has anticipated this, and Hansen and his band are destroyed.

From the first peddler to enter the valley in the spring, the Captain learns of a major military campaign in the Upper Rhineland and decides to seek employment with Bernard of Saxe-Weimar. Vogel wants to accompany him, fearing Gruber will have him killed once the Captain leaves. However, the Captain orders Vogel to stay as the condition of not sacking the village, leaving Geddes and Pirelli behind as guards.

After the Captain departs, the priest catches Erica praying to Satan to keep the Captain safe. The priest has her tortured and condemned to be burned at the stake. To spare her further suffering, Vogel kills her before her body is consigned to the flames. Enraged, Geddes pushes the priest into the fire and holds him there. Both are killed.

Meanwhile, the Captain and his men fight in a night assault on a fortified city. He returns to the valley with the only other survivor of his band. Vogel tries to warn him, but the Captain rides into an ambush set by Gruber. The Captain, however, is dying of his battle wounds, so there is no fighting. He tells Vogel, "You were right. I was wrong." Inge, a young woman who has fallen in love with Vogel, wants to leave with him, but he tells her to stay, and walks off alone.

Cast

Production
The novel was published in 1960. The New York Times called it "oddly compelling". The Chicago Tribune called it "a strange and memorable book."

In July 1967 it was announced that James Clavell, then enjoying success with the release of the film To Sir With Love and the book Tai-Pan, would adapt the book into a screenplay and direct a film adaptation for the Mirisch Corporation.

In November 1968 it was announced Clavell would make the film for ABC Pictures.  The head of ABC was Martin Baum who was Clavell's agent and who had helped put together To Sir, with Love.

Clavell was going to make the film after The Great Siege, a story of the Siege of Malta, which he was going to do after Where's Jack? (1967). He ended up not making Great Siege. After he made The Last Valley he said he would write another book "to see if I've still got it." (This would become Shogun.)

Omar Sharif was the first star to sign. By June 1969 Michael Caine had also signed on. At one stage the film was going to be called Somewhere in the Mountains There is a Last Valley. It had the biggest budget of any picture made to that point by ABC Pictures.

Clavell cast much of the supporting cast from British rep companies.

Shooting
Filming started 25 August 1969 in Austria.

The film was mostly shot in Tyrol, Austria (Trins and Gschnitz and the Gschnitztal Valley). Actor Martin Miller collapsed and died on the set before shooting of the first scene commenced.

Reception

Box office
The film was one of the most popular movies at the British box office in 1971. However, it was an expensive failure overall. It earned rentals of $380,000 in North America and $900,000 in other countries, recording an overall loss of $7,185,000.

Critical
The Monthly Film Bulletin called it "unexpectedly terse, elegant and intelligent."

With its setting in the Thirty Years' War, it covered a period never previously depicted on film (apart from 1933's Queen Christina). In this light, George MacDonald Fraser wrote in 1988, "The plot left me bewildered - in fact the whole bloody business is probably an excellent microcosm of the Thirty Years' War, with no clear picture of what is happening and half the cast ending up dead to no purpose. To that extent, it must be rated a successful film. ... As a drama, The Last Valley is not remarkable; as a reminder of what happened in Central Europe, 1618-48, and shaped the future of Germany, it reads an interesting lesson." Fraser says of the stars, "Michael Caine ... gives one of his best performances as the hard-bitten mercenary captain, nicely complemented by Omar Sharif as the personification of reason."

Home media
The Last Valley was released on VHS by Magnetic Video Corporation in 1981, and on CED by CBS/Fox Video in 1983. Since then, it has been released on DVD through three different labels: by Anchor Bay Entertainment on November 16, 1999, by MGM Home Entertainment on May 25, 2004, and by Kino Lorber Studio Classics (on both DVD and Blu-ray) on June 23, 2020.

References

Sources

External links

1970s adventure drama films
1970s war drama films
Films based on British novels
British independent films
Films set in the 1630s
British war drama films
Films directed by James Clavell
Films with screenplays by James Clavell
Films set in Germany
Films set in the Holy Roman Empire
Films set in the Alps
Films scored by John Barry (composer)
American independent films
British adventure drama films
American adventure drama films
American war drama films
Films about witchcraft
Films shot in Austria
Thirty Years' War in popular culture
Cinerama Releasing Corporation films
1971 drama films
1970s English-language films
Films about mercenaries
1970s American films
1970s British films